James Rothery Simpson (July 29, 1899 –  September 29, 1962) was a blocking back in the National Football League. Simpson first played with the Toledo Maroons during the 1922 NFL season. The following season, he was a member of the St. Louis All-Stars, but did not see any playing time during a regular-season game. He played with the Kenosha Maroons during his final season after the Toledo Maroons made the move from Toledo, Ohio to Kenosha, Wisconsin.

References

Players of American football from Ohio
Toledo Maroons players
St. Louis All-Stars players
Kenosha Maroons players
American football quarterbacks
Detroit Titans football players
1899 births
1962 deaths